The Federal Trust Building is a historic 12-story office building in Lincoln, Nebraska. It was built by the Olson Construction Company in 1926-1927 for the Federal Trust Company, an investment and insurance company co-founded by Carl E. Reynolds and Ira E. Atkinson. The building was designed in the Gothic Revival style by Meginnis and Schaumberg, an architectural firm co-founded by Harry Meginnis and Edward G. Schaumberg. It has been listed on the National Register of Historic Places since April 25, 2002.

References

National Register of Historic Places in Lincoln, Nebraska
Gothic Revival architecture in Nebraska
Office buildings completed in 1927
Office buildings in Nebraska
1926 establishments in Nebraska